Leonid Gulov (born September 29, 1981, in Narva, Estonia) is a retired Estonian rower. He was fourth in the double sculls event with Tõnu Endrekson at the 2004 Summer Olympics in Athens. He is a member of rowing club "SK Narva Energia" located in Narva.

Junior years
Gulov's first appearance in the World Rowing Junior Championships was in 1997 in the quadruple sculls event (23rd). In 1998 and 1999 he won the Junior Championships gold medals in the single sculls event. In 2000 he won the gold medal in the U-23 World Regatta in the double sculls event with Andrei Šilin. He repeated the world title in 2001 competing with Tõnu Endrekson.

Olympic Games
His Olympic Games debut took place in Sydney 2000, where he competed in the double sculls event with Andrei Šilin and they achieved 9th position overall.

His second appearance in the Olympic Games was in Athens 2004, where he competed in the double sculls event with Tõnu Endrekson. The men were third in their preliminary heat and second in semi-final thus earning a place in the Final A. They held the sixth position for the first 1500 metres, but with the strong final 500 metres they managed to clinch the fourth position. Eventually they lost the bronze medal to Italians Rossano Galtarossa and Alessio Sartori by 2.37 seconds.

World championships
Gulov debuted in the World Rowing Championships in 1999 in St. Catharines,  Canada where he competed with Šilin and they were second in the Final B earning 8th place.

2001 in Lucerne, Switzerland he competed in the quadruple sculls event with Endrekson, Šilin and Silver Sonntak. They won the Final B and earned 7th place.

2003 in Milan, Italy he was a member of the quadruple sculls team with Endrekson, Šilin and Sonntak. They won the Final B and earned 7th place.

Gulov won his first World Championships medal in 2005 in Gifu, Japan in the quadruple sculls event with Andrei Jämsä, Endrekson and Jüri Jaanson when they finished third after Poland and Slovenia.

2006 in Eton, Great Britain he competed in the double sculls event with Vladimir Latin (20th).

2007 in Munich, Germany he decided to participate in the single sculls event, but the result was a disappointment when he finished 24th.

Rowing World Cup

Overall wins
Quadruple sculls: 2005

References

External links
 

1981 births
Living people
Estonian male rowers
Rowers at the 2000 Summer Olympics
Rowers at the 2004 Summer Olympics
Olympic rowers of Estonia
Sportspeople from Narva
Estonian people of Russian descent
World Rowing Championships medalists for Estonia